Onygena is the type genus of the fungal family Onygenaceae. The genus contains five species found in North America and Europe that grow on bones and feathers.

References

External links

Onygenales
Eurotiomycetes genera
Taxa named by Christiaan Hendrik Persoon
Taxa described in 1800